Elmer Rafael Diktonius (20 January 1896 in Helsinki – 23 September 1961 in Kauniainen) was a Finnish poet and composer, who wrote in both Swedish and in Finnish. In 1922 he established an avant-garde magazine, Ultra, which had Finnish and Swedish editions. He also involved in the establishment of another avant-garde magazine Quosego. He mainly lived in Tuomistonoja of the Röykkä village.

Diktonius is buried in the Hietaniemi Cemetery in Helsinki.

References

External links

at Nordic Authors

Publications  

1896 births
1961 deaths
Writers from Helsinki
People from Uusimaa Province (Grand Duchy of Finland)
Finnish socialists
Finnish male composers
Finnish poets in Swedish
20th-century poets
Burials at Hietaniemi Cemetery
20th-century male musicians
20th-century Finnish composers
Finnish magazine founders